Agbeli Kaklo is a Ghanaian and Togolese snack made from cassava and eaten by the locals, the snack originated from the southern part of the Volta Region. It is very crunchy and mostly eaten with hard coconut. The snack is named as such because it is derived from cassava.

Ingredients 
The ingredients used in preparation:

 Milled/Grated Cassava.
 Water.
 Onion. 
 Oil.
 Coconut.
 Salt.

Preparation 
How to prepare Agbeli Kaklo:

 Squeeze cassava in a mesh to remove the moisture.
 Add the dried cassava, onion and salt and mix thoroughly. 
 Mold into balls.
 Deep fry the balls in vegetable oil until golden brown.
 Serve the Agbeli Kaklo with dried coconut.

References

External links 
 How to prepare Agbeli Kaklo.

Ghanaian cuisine
African cuisine
Snack foods